Country Code: +500 (partial)
International Call Prefix: 

Telephone numbers in South Georgia and the South Sandwich Islands.

+500 4XXXX

References

South Georgia and the South Sandwich Islands
South Georgia and the South Sandwich Islands-related lists